Hopea sphaerocarpa is a tree in the family Dipterocarpaceae, native to Borneo. The specific epithet sphaerocarpa means "round fruit".

Description
It has buttresses, including flying (detached) buttresses, and stilt roots. The bark is smooth.

Distribution and habitat
Hopea sphaerocarpa is endemic to Borneo.

Conservation
Hopea sphaerocarpa has been assessed as near threatened on the IUCN Red List. It is threatened by conversion of land for palm oil plantations and other intensive agriculture. It is also threatened by logging activities. The species is found in some protected areas.

References

sphaerocarpa
Endemic flora of Borneo
Plants described in 1892
Taxonomy articles created by Polbot